Tulips of Haarlem is a 1970 Italian drama film directed by Franco Brusati. It was entered into the 1970 Cannes Film Festival.

Cast
 Carole André - Sarah
 Pierre Cressoy
 Gianni Garko - Bernardo
 Frank Grimes - Pierre
 Gianni Giuliano - Gustave

References

External links

1970 films
1970s Italian-language films
1970 drama films
Films directed by Franco Brusati
Films scored by Benedetto Ghiglia
Italian drama films
1970s Italian films